I'm in Love is the fourth album released by R&B singer Evelyn "Champagne" King on RCA Records in 1981. It was produced by Morrie Brown, Willie Lester, Rodney Brown, Kashif, and Lawrence Jones.

Background
By the time her previous album Call on Me was released, disco music in the United States faced severe backlash across the country pressuring it to move underground. The now infamous so-called "death of disco" propelled artists to look elsewhere for inspiration, one of which was the way of "one-man bands" pioneered by Stevie Wonder. King was one of the previous successful disco artists who followed the new direction in music, "my whole thing was, I was a big believer in making sure others were heard because they had a different sound." Theodore Life (or T. Life) who produced her chart-topping song "Shame" and album Call on Me was replaced by multi-instrumentalist Kashif and songwriters Morrie Brown, and Paul Lawrence Jones III. The songwriting duo Rodney Brown and Willie Lester, who were involved in working with Gayle Adams and Sharon Redd, composed, arranged and produced  "Don't Hide Our Love," "What Are You Waiting For,"  "The Other Side Of Love," "I Can't Take It," and "The Best Is Yet To Come." On her producer change King commented, "I'm not going to say my new producers were a better fit than, say, T. Life. I'm going to just say they were a good match for the time. [...] If you keep staying in the same area, if you sound the same all the time—people can get bored with that. They made sure that Evelyn hit the top spot again! It was just fun."

History
The album peaked at number 6 on the R&B albums chart. It also reached number 28 on the Billboard 200. It produced the hit singles "I'm In Love", "If You Want My Lovin'", "Don't Hide Our Love", and "Spirit of the Dancer". The album was certified gold by the RIAA. The album was digitally remastered and reissued on CD with bonus tracks in 2011 by Big Break Records.

Track listing

Personnel
Percussion - Bashiri Johnson
Backing vocals - B.J Nelson
Lyrics, music by - Kashif Saleem
Horns, strings - Ralph Schuckett
Guitar - Ira Siegel
Drums - Steve Walker
French horn - Robert Gloff
Mixed by, recorded by – "Magic Hands", Steve Goldman (If You Want My Lovin'")

Charts

Singles

References

External links

Evelyn "Champagne" King albums
1981 albums
RCA Records albums